Alexander Decker (born 2 February 1904, date of death unknown) was an Austrian boxer who competed in the 1924 Summer Olympics. He was eliminated in the first round of the welterweight tournament by losing his fight to Théodore Stauffer.

References

External links
Part 5 the boxing tournament

1904 births
Year of death missing
Welterweight boxers
Olympic boxers of Austria
Boxers at the 1924 Summer Olympics
Austrian male boxers